"Move It Up" is a song by Italian group Cappella, released in September 1994 via various European labels as the seventh single from their second studio album, U Got 2 Know (1994). It features lead vocals by Jackie Rawe and charted in several European countries. In Ireland and the UK, it was issued as a double A-side with "Big Beat".

Chart performance
"Move It Up" peaked within the top 10 in Finland, Italy, and the Netherlands. The single was a top-20 hit in Belgium, Switzerland, and the United Kingdom, as well as on the Eurochart Hot 100, where it reached number 19. In the UK, "Move It Up" peaked at number 16 during its first week on the UK Singles Chart, on 9 October 1994; It spent two weeks at that position. On the UK Dance Chart, the song reached number 10. Outside Europe, it charted in Australia, where it peaked at number 104.

Music video
A music video was produced to promote the song. It was directed by La La Land.

Charts

Weekly charts

Year-end charts

References

External links
 

1994 singles
Cappella (band) songs
Electronic songs
1994 songs
Songs written by Gianfranco Bortolotti
Music videos directed by La La Land